Garbiñe Muguruza was the defending champion, but lost in the second round to Lesia Tsurenko.

Kiki Bertens, en route to her first hard court & Premier 5 level title, defeated the world no. 2 & no. 1 players, in the second round and final respectively. She became the first Dutch woman to win a title in Cincinnati by defeating Simona Halep in the final, 2–6, 7–6(8–6), 6–2.

Seeds
The top eight seeds received a bye into the second round.

Draw

Finals

Top half

Section 1

Section 2

Bottom half

Section 3

Section 4

Qualifying

Seeds

Qualifiers

Lucky loser

Draw

First qualifier

Second qualifier

Third qualifier

Fourth qualifier

Fifth qualifier

Sixth qualifier

Seventh qualifier

Eighth qualifier

Ninth qualifier

Tenth qualifier

Eleventh qualifier

Twelfth qualifier

References

Sources
Main Draw
Qualifying Draw

Women's Singles